Tabanus spodopterus also known as the black horned giant horsefly is a species of biting horse-fly. It is widespread in Europe, but only one doubtful specimen has been found in the United Kingdom.

References

Tabanidae
Insects described in 1820
Diptera of Europe
Taxa named by Christian Rudolph Wilhelm Wiedemann